Odlum is a surname. Notable people with the surname include:

Doris Odlum (1890–1985), British psychiatrist
Floyd Odlum (1892–1976), American lawyer and industrialist
George Odlum (1934–2003), Saint Lucian politician 
Jon Odlum (1936–2013), Saint Lucian politician
Robert Emmet Odlum (1851–1885), American swimming instructor
Charlotte Odlum Smith (1840–1917), American reformer

See also
Odlums Group